Orlando Yntema Peña (born February 21, 1986) is a  Dutch professional baseball pitcher for the Curaçao Neptunus in the Dutch Baseball League. He played for Team Netherlands in the 2019 European Baseball Championship and at the Africa/Europe 2020 Olympic Qualification tournament in Italy in September 2019.

Career
Yntema was born in the Dominican Republic. His Frisian Dutch father worked there as a diplomat, where he married a Dominican nurse and has lived since 1972. After having completed his primary and secondary education in Santo Domingo at age 17, Yntema was signed as an undrafted free agent by the San Francisco Giants in 2003. He played in the Dominican Summer League in 2003 and 2005 and the Arizona League in 2004 and 2006 before missing 2007 with an injury. He played in Class-A in 2008 and 2009 with the Augusta Greenjackets and Salem-Keizer Volcanoes.

He played in the Italian Baseball League in 2010 and then the Dutch Major League in 2011 and 2012.

In 2011, he got the win in the final game of the World Championship final against Cuba. He pitched seven innings and allowed one run.

He played for Team Netherlands in the 2019 European Baseball Championship, and competed for it at the Africa/Europe 2020 Olympic Qualification tournament in Italy in September 2019.

References

External links

1986 births
Living people
Arizona League Giants players
Augusta GreenJackets players
Baseball pitchers
Catania Warriors players
Curacao Neptunus players
Dominican Republic people of Dutch descent
DOOR Neptunus players
Dutch expatriate baseball players in Italy
Dutch expatriate baseball players in the United States
People from Puerto Plata, Dominican Republic
Salem-Keizer Volcanoes players
UVV players
2013 World Baseball Classic players
2015 WBSC Premier12 players
2016 European Baseball Championship players
2017 World Baseball Classic players
2019 European Baseball Championship players